2021 in television may refer to
 2021 in American television for television related events in the United States.
 List of 2021 American television debuts for television debut related events in the United States.
 2021 in Australian television for television related events in Australia.
 2021 in British television for television related events in Great Britain.
 2021 in Scottish television for television related events in Scotland.
 2021 in Canadian television for television related events in Canada.
 2021 in Indian television for television related events in India.
 2021 in Telugu-language television for television related events in Telugu.
 2021 in Irish television for television related events in Ireland.
 2021 in Italian television for television related events in Italy.
 2021 in Japanese television for television related events in Japan.
 2021 in Mexican television for television related events in Mexico.
 2021 in Philippine television for television related events in the Philippines.
 2021 in South Korean television for television related events in South Korea.
 2021 in Spanish television for television related events in Spain.

 
Mass media timelines by year